Marie Stewart may refer to:

 Marie Stewart, actor, stage name Marie Doro
 Marie Stewart, Countess of Mar
 Marie Stewart (farmer), New Zealand poultry farmer and promoter